Edgar Hearn (2 April 1929 – 4 October 1983) was a British boxer. He competed in the men's heavyweight event at the 1952 Summer Olympics.

References

1929 births
1983 deaths
British male boxers
Olympic boxers of Great Britain
Boxers at the 1952 Summer Olympics
Boxers from Greater London
Heavyweight boxers